Tomilin is a Russian masculine surname, its feminine counterpart is Tomilina. It may refer to
Pavel Tomilin (born 1985), Russian football player
Vitaly Tomilin (born 1974), Russian ice hockey player

See also
Tomilin Glacier in Antarctica

Russian-language surnames